Phap Hoa Temple (Vietnamese: Chùa Pháp Hoa), meaning Dharma Lotus Temple, is a Buddhist temple located in Pennington, South Australia. Established in 1978, it moved to its current location in December 1989. It is a member of the United Vietnamese Buddhist Congregation and the head is the Most Venerable Thich Nhu Hue, and the abbot is the Reverend Thich Vien Tri.

History
Phap Hoa Temple was established in 1978 at a small house located at 83 Addison Road, Rosewater, South Australia by a group of Vietnamese immigrants, led by Nguyen Van Tuoi for the purpose of attending to the spiritual needs of immigrant Vietnamese Buddhists. The Most Venerable Thich Nhu Hue was invited to come from Japan to direct the temple. Due to the small size, a search for a plot of larger land to construct a temple was undertaken, and building of the temple in its current location began on a 5000 m² plot on 19 March 1984. The main hall of the temple was opened on 23 December 1989. 

On 26 June 2003 the main hall suffered extensive damage, when an intruder irreparably vandalized the majority of the statues and decorations. This required the replacement of a large number of statues. Along with a new statue of Avalokitesvara Bodhisattva located in the courtyard of the Temple, and a Three Entrance Fence, the refurbished hall was unveiled in a ceremony on 27 June 2004 in the presence of South Australian Premier Mike Rann and the Opposition leader Rob Kerin.

See also
Buddhism in Australia
 Bodhinyana Monastery
 Chung Tian Temple
 Nan Tien Temple
 Sunnataram Forest Monastery
List of Buddhist temples in Hanoi

External links

Asian-Australian culture in South Australia
Buddhist temples in Australia
Religious buildings and structures in Adelaide
Overseas Vietnamese Buddhist temples
Religious buildings and structures completed in 1989
20th-century Buddhist temples
1978 establishments in Australia